All the Way Back to Liverpool is a 2012 German–British documentary film directed by Chandra Fleig which has been released as a music webisode in 2014.

It features the work of award-winning music producer Mike Crossey, singer-songwriter Lucy Styles, Paul Crowe and Ian McMillan both former members of the band The Aeroplanes.

The documentary shows a group of musicians and friends as they write, rehearse and record new material and shows the creative process of music production and songwriting from the initial idea to the final product.

The film was made by German filmmaker and musician Chandra Fleig who lived in Liverpool at the end of the 90s and studied at the Liverpool Institute of Performing Arts.

Musicians
 Paul Crowe (guitars, vocals)
 Lucy Styles (keyboards, guitars, transverse flute, vocals)
 Ian McMillan (vocals, drums)
 Mike Crossey (bass)
 Chandra Fleig (vocals, guitars)

Production
All nine episodes of the documentary were filmed in ten days in Liverpool, including three days in the Motor Museum (previously called "the Pink Museum"). The project has been supported by Film University Babelsberg Konrad Wolf.

Soundtrack
A soundtrack has also been released as a digital release in 2014, containing two songs "Wipe you from my list" and "My old friend doubt" which were recorded in the Motor Museum.

External links
 
 
 Interview Joe Norman with Chandra Fleig  at Facebook
 Feature about the documentary  at Film University Babelsberg
Newspaper Interview Märkische Allgemeins 

2012 films
British documentary films
German documentary films
Documentary films about rock music and musicians
2010s English-language films
2010s British films
2010s German films